Flathead High School is an American public secondary school located in Kalispell, Montana. It is one of two high schools in District #5 of the Kalispell Public Schools.

History 
Flathead High school was founded in the late 1890s.  Its original name was Flathead County High School.

Academics
Flathead High School offers the International Baccalaureate Programme, including the IB diploma programme. Flathead became the first IB school in the state of Montana on 16 February 2004 and is part of the IB North American region.

Athletics 

The Flathead High School mascot is the Brave and Bravette. 

State Championships include:
 Speech and Debate — 1916, 1946, 1947, 1948, 1949, 1951, 1976, 1985, 1986, 1994, 1998, 1999, 2000, 2001, 2003, 2004, 2005, 2006, 2007, 2015, 2020
 Girls Cross Country — 1971, 1972, 1980, 1986, 1987, 1989, 1991, 1993, 1994, 1996, 2001, 2002 (#13 U.S.), 2003 (#12 U.S.), 2004 (#6 U.S.)
 Boys Cross Country — 1985, 1986, 1994, 1997 (#24 U.S.), 1998 (#3 U.S.), 1999 (#9 U.S.), 2000 (#2 U.S.), 2001, 2002, 2004, 2005
 Girls Track and Field — 1969, 1970, 1971, 1973, 1977, 1978, 1979, 1988, 1989, 1991, 1992, 1993, 1994, 1995, 1998, 1999, 2005
 Girls Swimming —1977, 1978 1981, 1982, 1990, 1991, 1992, 1995, 2003, 2005 (tie)
 Boys Wrestling — 1973, 2004, 2006, 2007, 2008, 2009, 2010, 2017, 2022
 Girls Wrestling -  2022
 Boys Track and Field — 1907, 1995, 1996, 2000, 2001, 2002, 2003
 Football — 1950, 1951, 1958, 1959, 1970
 Boys Basketball — 1951, 1952, 1970, 1982, 1989
 Boys Soccer — 1994, 1995, 1999, 2005, 2006
 Boys Golf — 1966, 1983
 Girls Golf — 1966, 1967, 1970, 1991
 Girls Basketball — 1996, 2000, 2001
 Boys Tennis — 1995, 1996
 Girls Soccer — 1993
 Girls Softball — 2003
 Girls Tennis — 2000
 Girls Volleyball — 2001
 Boys Swimming — 1986

Notable alumni
Flip Gordon, Class of 2010, professional wrestler
Brock Osweiler, Class of 2009, professional football player
Shane Bitney Crone, Class of 2004, filmmaker, writer, and speaker
Lex Hilliard, Class of 2003, professional football player
Mike Reilly, Class of 2002, professional football player
Dylan McFarland, Class of 1999, professional football player
Daniel Parker, Class of 1978, wildlife sculptor
Alice Ritzman, Class of 1970, professional golfer
Sam McCullum, Class of 1970, professional football player
Jim Otten, Class of 1969, professional baseball player
Eugene Peterson, Class of 1953, clergyman, scholar, author, and poet
Willard A. Saunders, Class of 1923, Rear admiral, USN
Fred Brinkman, Class of 1912, architect

References

External links 
Flathead High School official website

Schools in Flathead County, Montana
Public high schools in Montana
International Baccalaureate schools in Montana
1903 establishments in Montana
Kalispell, Montana
Educational institutions established in 1903